Whitney Dean (also Carter) is a fictional character from the BBC soap opera EastEnders, played by Shona McGarty. The character is the ward of long-running character Bianca Jackson (Patsy Palmer) and was introduced on 1 April 2008 when Palmer returned to the series after a nine-year absence. Whitney is described by executive producer Diederick Santer as both an equal to, and younger version of Bianca, and is the oldest of Bianca's four children. Whitney was absent from the soap across four weeks in 2012 when McGarty was suspended for repeated lateness. McGarty took a short break in 2017 and Whitney departed on 29 May and returned on 31 July of that year. On 1 June 2018, McGarty filmed her 1000th episode as Whitney.

Since her debut on the show, Whitney's storylines have revolved around the fracturing of her family life; her sexual abuse by Bianca's fiancé Tony King (Chris Coghill); her sexual exploitation by local pimp Rob Grayson (Jody Latham); her one-night stand with Joey Branning (David Witts) in the midst of being engaged to her first fiancé Tyler Moon (Tony Discipline); her marriage with Lee Carter (Danny-Boy Hatchard) that ultimately breaks down as a result of his depression and subsequent infidelity with Abi Branning (Lorna Fitzgerald), which resulted in him passing chlamydia to Whitney and consequently led her to miscarry their unborn baby; her romantic crush on Lee's father Mick (Danny Dyer); her wedding to Callum Highway (Tony Clay) that ends in disaster after she learns that he is having a romantic affair with another man Ben Mitchell (Max Bowden), shortly before their reception at The Queen Victoria public house is caught in an armed siege perpetuated by escaped convict Hunter Owen (Charlie Winter); her ordeal of being stalked by Tony's vengeful son Leo King (Tom Wells), which soon culminates with Whitney killing him in self-defence; being impregnated by Zack Hudson (James Farrar) and discovering that her baby has Edwards syndrome and omphalocele, which ultimately leads to her deciding to have an abortion.

The child sexual abuse storyline between Whitney and Tony marked the first time that the subject matter has been broached in a UK soap opera, so much so that the matter was researched and developed with advice and approval from the National Society for the Prevention of Cruelty to Children. The inappropriate nature of Whitney's relationship with Tony resulted in over 200 complaints being made to the BBC and television regulatory body Ofcom by members of the public, and "one of the darkest and most disturbing storylines EastEnders has ever attempted" by the Daily Mirror Beth Neil. The NSPCC however have praised the storyline for "helping to raise awareness of the hidden nature of sexual abuse". The storyline also gained EastEnders a Royal Television Society Programme Award in March 2009 in the Soap and Continuing Drama category.

Storylines
Whitney Dean made her first appearance as the adopted daughter of her legal guardian Bianca Jackson (Patsy Palmer). Together with Bianca's young biological daughter Tiffany Dean (Maisie Smith) and her two brothers Liam Butcher (James Forde) and Morgan Jackson-King (Devon Higgs) respectively, they all end up getting evicted by their landlord. The children spend a week in care after Bianca is arrested for assaulting a police officer, returning to her custody a week later and moving into Walford at the home of her grandmother Pat Evans (Pam St Clement). Over the next few months, Bianca becomes the beneficiary of a mystery "guardian angel" - who is revealed to be Whitney. At one point Whitney tells Bianca she found a winning lottery ticket, but kept it secret as she knew that Bianca would spend the money. Bianca reluctantly agrees to deposit the money; however, Whitney hides some to be used in emergencies.

As Whitney settles herself in Walford with her siblings and Bianca altogether, they end up getting reacquainted with Bianca's boyfriend Tony King (Chris Coghill) following his release from prison in September 2008. When Whitney and Tony end up getting reunited in her bedroom, they kiss and Tony tells Whitney their relationship is back on and soon they'll get away together. It is then revealed that Tony is a pedophile who has been sexually abusing Whitney by grooming her ever since she was 12, effectively raping her whilst deceiving her into believing otherwise. They had a sexual relationship that initially ended after Tony served a year-long prison sentence for assaulting a boy who apparently harassed Whitney. As time goes on, Whitney tells Tony that she has kept some of the lottery winnings so they can run away together. When Bianca harangues him about the prospect of marriage, he gives her Whitney's money to put a down-payment on a flat. When Whitney and her classmate Peter Beale (Thomas Law) are cast in a school play, Tony is secretly envious of them rehearsing in private and punches Peter out of jealously. Whitney convinces Peter and his sister Lucy (Melissa Suffield) not to report the attack to the police, but Tony blames her for the incident and ends their affair. Devastated when Tony accepts Bianca's marriage proposal, Whitney locks herself in her bedroom. Not knowing what to do, Bianca approaches local GP Poppy Merritt (Amy Darcy) for help and she refers Whitney to a psychiatrist. Bianca takes her away on holiday, attempting to mend their relationship. When they return, Tony and Whitney share a passionate kiss, and Tony informs Whitney that their relationship is back on.

When Tony begins grooming Whitney's best-friend Lauren Branning (Madeline Duggan) into harboring romantic feelings for him, Whitney becomes jealous and demands Tony to focus on her rather than Lauren. As her sixteenth birthday approaches, she buys tickets for them to travel abroad. Tony loses interest in Whitney and hides her passport, but it is found and returned to her. On the day she turns sixteen, Whitney confesses her relationship with Tony to Bianca. Horrified, she confronts Tony and realizes that he has been abusing Whitney all along. She calls the police and Tony is arrested, much to Whitney's dismay and outrage. Whitney confronts Bianca for her actions and Bianca tries to get Whitney to see what Tony is really like, which causes Whitney to have a breakdown. The next day, the police reveal that Tony has been released on bail. Moments later, he secretly confronts Bianca and tries to explain himself to her. She refuses and Tony begins insulting Bianca, unaware that Whitney is hearing their argument in the background. Whitney comes to Bianca's defense and tells Tony to leave them alone. Tony then tries to flee the square, but is rearrested by the police and sent to prison awaiting trial; Whitney decides to make a statement to the police. 

In the build-up to Tony's trial, Whitney contacts her biological mother Debra Dean (Ruth Gemmell) and tries to discuss the past; however, Debra is not interested and rejects her. She later meets Todd Taylor (Ashley Kumar) and agrees to go on a date with him, which goes well until he asks about past relationships. Whitney runs away and Bianca's ex-husband Ricky Butcher (Sid Owen) finds her drunk. Todd returns and Whitney agrees to another date. When Whitney finds a condom in his wallet, she assumes he wants to have sex with her and runs away. Debra turns up unexpectedly, claiming she is homeless, but reveals she is planning to move to Greece when she has enough money and says Whitney can come with her. Whitney accepts, but later realises that Debra is using her and she is only there to hide from someone. Debra later tells Whitney she has a half-brother, Ryan Malloy (Neil McDermott). Whitney then takes back her statement against Tony but after Whitney's barrister sees her mobile phone containing the messages from Tony, he is sentenced to 13 years' imprisonment.

Following Tony's imprisonment, Whitney learns that Tiffany is Ricky's daughter and is distressed by the revelation at first - though nonetheless accepts Tiffany as her sister despite the pair not being blood related. Whitney soon repairs her friendship with Todd, and they kiss at Ricky and Bianca's engagement party. Their reunion is short-lived, and Whitney breaks up with him in favor of Bianca's half-brother Billie (Devon Anderson). Soon enough Whitney is attacked by Billie's jealous friend Kylie (Elarica Gallacher), and when his friends cause trouble at a grime night at The Queen Victoria public house, Whitney asks him to choose between her and his former gang. Billie chooses Whitney, and Kylie takes revenge by attempting to shoot him, shooting his uncle Jack (Scott Maslen) instead. Jack is hospitalized with major injuries, and Whitney struggles to help Billie deal with his guilt and subsequent anger and rejection from the Branning and Jackson families. She is further deeply upset when Billie decides to join the army in an attempt to make Jack proud. At Billie's birthday party, Whitney ends up kissing Peter. She spends the night with him and the next day is upset to learn that Billie has died in his sleep. She blames herself for leaving the party after she sees a text message from Billie saying he still loved her. She sends a reply and lays flowers and candles for him. However, she later goes back to Peter for comfort and they befriend each other once more on the day of the funeral. The pair then begin a relationship. However, Billie's friend Connor Stanley (Arinze Kene) starts flirting with her and asks her why she would date someone like Peter after dating Billie. He also asks her to sell some stolen jewellery for him and she agrees. 

By 2011, Whitney has fallen in love with Connor. But it soon ends when Whitney finds out that Connor has been two-timing with her and Bianca's mother Carol (Lindsey Coulson). Appalled, she rejects them and informs Bianca about this; Bianca responds by attacking Connor before turning herself into the police and being imprisoned. Whitney and Carol argue over Connor, and Whitney feels she is not wanted by her family so decides to move out and stays with Ricky's sister and Ryan's wife Janine Butcher (Charlie Brooks). Later on, Whitney begins working for Janine's enemy Kat Slater (Jessie Wallace) after she offers her a work trial at The Vic for a job. It nearly falls apart when Kat catches Whitney giving free drinks to Janine, but she lets her off - telling Whitney she is a natural - and Whitney soon works well at the till. When Kat catches her stealing again, she sacks Whitney, leaving Janine angry with her for this. After Whitney sees Janine successfully pickpocket someone, she decides to try it herself - but ends up being hit in the face. Whitney is thereupon approached by a man called Rob Grayson (Jody Latham), who helps her and buys her food before returns her to Albert Square; he also gives Whitney his phone number before she returns home. Whitney later tries to kiss Max, causing her to fall out with Lauren. She also argues with Carol, rejects Ricky and is rejected by Liam, Tiffany and Morgan for ruining Ricky's birthday cake days earlier. Upset, Whitney contacts Rob and asks to stay with him - to which he accepts. She throws her phone away and tells nobody that she is going. Janine lies about Whitney's whereabouts but when she admits she does not know where Whitney is, Lauren (now played by Jacqueline Jossa) and Janine attempt to find her, and Lauren sees her in Dartford going into a club. Lauren goes back with her to her bedsit, but Whitney does not want to go, saying she and Rob are in love. Lauren is then thrown out by Rob. Whitney has sex with a man called Chris (Richard Simons) and it is revealed that Whitney has been having sex with Rob's friends to pay off his debts to them. Janine tries to get Whitney to come home but she refuses, and Rob ejects Janine. Rob then drags Whitney out of the house and into his car, while Janine and Lauren see them driving off. They go to a house where Whitney meets another woman Chloe (Georgia Henshaw) who is being exploited. Whitney tells Rob she wants to leave, but he says to either be nice to his friends or he will hurt her. He locks her in a room so she breaks the window and escapes, stopping a car and asking for help, while Rob shouts after her.

The following month, she sends Lauren a message and meets her outside the police station, looking rough, as she has been arrested for shoplifting. Whitney opts to live with Dot Branning (June Brown) instead of her close family, but Dot convinces her to move back to Ricky's. When Ryan returns from a holiday, he learns of Whitney's ordeal and urges her to go to the police and get tested for sexually transmitted infections. She says she is not ready to go to the police but agrees to the test, which shows she has a chlamydia infection. When Whitney starts a relationship with a man named Lee (Mitchell Hunt), it is revealed that he is a friend of Rob's, and when Whitney agrees to meet Lee by text, Rob takes control of Lee's mobile phone. She allows Rob to take her home but then tells him to wait outside while she escapes through the back door and hitches a lift to Southend-on-Sea with friends. She leaves him a voicemail message not knowing that he has followed her. He finds her in her hotel room and tells her how much he loves her, but when Fatboy (Ricky Norwood) comes in, Rob attacks him, so Whitney tells him to leave. Fatboy calls Ryan, who comes to Southend to look for Rob. When he finds him, they fight and fall over the edge of the pier. The next day, a body is recovered from the sea, and is later revealed to be Rob who has died. Whitney thinks Ryan may also be dead until he appears. She tells him she has told the police everything about Rob, including Ryan's fight with him, and Ryan tells Whitney he has to leave. They say an emotional farewell.

Whitney takes an interest in Tyler Moon (Tony Discipline) but refuses to date him. Whitney applies for a new work experience at the local nursery which she later gets. When Michael Moon (Steve John Shepherd) tells his brother Tyler about Whitney's recent ordeal, he rejects her but later gives her his special Moon pendant to make up for it. Whitney agrees to go on a date with Tyler and they agree to have sex but Whitney is unsure as she remembers her past and runs out, telling Tyler she never wants to see him again. Tyler is hurt. He later tells Fatboy she needs a shrink which Whitney overhears. She runs out and kisses Fatboy and starts a relationship with him. Fatboy publicly declares his love for Whitney, but when he is unable to give her a driving lesson, Lucy (now played by Hetti Bywater) suggests that Tyler do it, because she knows that Tyler likes Whitney. Whitney starts to feel smothered by Fatboy's affections. Lucy teases Tyler by telling him that Fatboy plans to publicly propose to Whitney, so Tyler tells Whitney he likes her but Whitney says it is too late. Tyler then surprises Whitney by kissing her. Whitney, feeling guilty, refuses to go on holiday with Fatboy, and tells him to kiss her. He does, but she says it is like kissing her best friend. She then admits she wants Tyler, and Fatboy is heartbroken. Whitney then goes to see Tyler but finds him with Lucy, kissing. She then tells Tyler to leave her alone. However, Tyler later tells Whitney that he cannot, as he loves her. Whitney admits to feeling the same way, and they begin a relationship.

Whitney believes she is pregnant, and when she tells Tyler, he seems reluctant to take on a child. However, he comes round to the idea, but Whitney discovers she is not pregnant after all. Bianca is caught stealing money and returns to prison, but this time located in Suffolk. The rest of Whitney's family move to Suffolk to be near her, but Whitney stays and looks after the house, along with Bianca's uncle Derek Branning (Jamie Foreman). Soon after, Tyler moves in. Whitney is angry when Derek's son, Joey Branning (David Witts) kisses her. Several months later, after Bianca and the rest of the family move back, Whitney and Tyler plan to get their own home. Whitney tells Tyler about the kiss with Joey, so he breaks up with her. However, he regrets it and proposes to Whitney; she accepts. Bianca disapproves when she finds out. When Lauren kisses Tyler to make her ex-boyfriend Joey jealous, Whitney ends her friendship with Lauren. After several weeks Lauren and Whitney make up. She receives a letter from a stranger, which the letter is from Tony, asking Whitney to come and see him in prison. Whitney then goes to the prison to visit Tony but is told that he has committed suicide. Trying to come to terms from Tony's death, she goes out for lunch with Tyler at Scarlett's, but they later argue which leads to Whitney ending their engagement and storming out. She then goes for a drink at R&R and Joey tries to comfort her which leads them to start flirting with one another. They then share a kiss and go back to Joey's house to have sex. She tells Tyler, and they both realise that they will not work out, and Tyler leaves Walford.

Whitney gets a job as a teaching assistant at Walford Primary School. During one breaktime, she warns Dennis Rickman (Harry Hickles) not to run in the playground. He ignores her and falls over, grazing his arm. Whitney does not react in the professional manner she is supposed to, causing Dennis' injury to be ignored. When Dennis' mother, Sharon Watts (Letitia Dean), questions Dennis about his injury, he lies that Whitney assaulted him. Sharon complains and Whitney is suspended, but appeals for her job and is allowed to keep it. Whitney later sets her sights on newcomer Johnny Carter (Sam Strike), unaware that he is gay. Johnny's parents, Mick (Danny Dyer) and Linda Carter (Kellie Bright), hope that Johnny and Whitney will become an item, but his sister Nancy Carter (Maddy Hill) reveals to them that he is gay. A few weeks later, Johnny comes out to Whitney, which hurts her as she feels that Johnny has been using her. They later become good friends and Whitney forgives Johnny.

When Johnny's elder brother, Lee Carter (Danny-Boy Hatchard), returns from serving in Afghanistan, Whitney takes an instant liking to him and they share a kiss. She discovers that Lee had sex with Lucy, which upsets her greatly and she spams Lucy's Facebook page with horrible comments. The next day, Lucy is found dead. At her funeral, Tamwar Masood (Himesh Patel) discovers a condolences card with "Rot in Hell" written on it, and realises the handwriting matches Whitney's. When he confronts her, she tells him that Lucy was sending her abusive texts about her looks, and that she completely despised her. Feeling sorry for Whitney, Tamwar rips up the card, but it is later recovered by his suspicious sister, Shabnam Masood (Rakhee Thakrar).

Upon Lee's return from the army, Whitney gives the relationship another chance. She struggles with the prospect of making their romance sexual, but eventually agrees to when he talks about his feelings for her. Ryan's young daughter Lily Slater (Aine Garvey) comes to live in Walford when her mother Stacey Slater (Lacey Turner) is sent to prison, and Whitney babysits her. She puts a photo of herself and Lily online and is shocked when Ryan contacts her under the alias of 'Simon Parker'. After speaking with Johnny and Lee, she decides to reply. Stacey is granted her appeal and freed but Whitney worries it will ruin her relationship with Lily. Whitney tells Lily about Ryan saying she could possibly meet him. When Stacey finds out, she argues with Whitney and says she will not be seeing Lily again. Whitney then messages Ryan saying she needs to see him urgently. Whitney then arranges to meet Ryan at the park. Stacey and Lily visit the park whilst Whitney is waiting for Ryan. Stacey apologises to Whitney and she accepts. Whitney thinks Ryan has stood her up, so leaves with Stacey and Lily. Ryan turns up late and hides on seeing Stacey, and remains unseen as a result.

Bianca tells Whitney she is moving to Milton Keynes with her partner Terry Spraggan (Terry Alderton), and wants her to move with them and the children. Although originally agreeing, Lee persuades her to stay and she moves into the pub with the Carters. Lee develops depression, and when Whitney finds out, she struggles to support him at his lowest points. At Mick's stag party before his wedding to Linda, Lee knocks himself unconscious and is carried upstairs by Mick and Whitney. Whitney confesses to Mick that she intends to break up with Lee after the wedding, unable to handle his depression. However, she is unaware that Lee has overheard her via the baby monitor. On the day of the wedding, Lee goes missing and Whitney and Mick find him drunk at the park. Lee tells Whitney that he blames himself for her wanting to break up with him, and she promises him that they will work things out. Whitney later thanks Mick for helping her with Lee, but accidentally kisses him on the lips in the process. While Mick and Linda are on their honeymoon, Whitney invites Ryan back to Walford to see Lily, but while at the pub, he steals the cash from the safe, causing Whitney and Nancy to fight, just as Mick and Linda walk in on them. The next morning, Whitney contacts Ryan and he asks to meet in the park. Mick accompanies Whitney and assures a scared Ryan that he can trust him. It then emerges that Whitney told Mick that Ryan killed Rob, so Whitney and Mick convince Ryan to return the money and hand himself to the police, and Whitney will back him up in the hope of him being charged with manslaughter instead of murder, to which Ryan agrees. Whitney shares an emotional goodbye with Ryan as he heads into the police station. On the ride home from the police station, an upset Whitney tells Mick that she has feelings for him and kisses him again. Mick tells Linda what happened, so Linda tells her to stay away from Mick and not to give up on Lee. Whitney later visits Ryan in prison, stating that she is worried about Lee. When she accidentally says Mick's name, he guesses that she has feelings for Mick, which she denies. He then urges Whitney to help Lee, so she gets him a job interview at a local pub, however this causes major grievances between Lee and Nancy. Whitney is forced by Babe to tell Lee about her kissing Mick, and although Nancy tells her to move out, Lee's response is to propose marriage.

Whitney discovers she is pregnant by Lee, but all her hints and attempts to tell him fail. Linda realises and is ecstatic when Whitney confirms it. Linda tells Mick, and when Whitney tells Lee, Mick and Linda rush into the room to celebrate before he has a chance to let the news sink in. Whitney and Lee are both diagnosed with chlamydia and Whitney blames herself due to Rob. Abi admits to Whitney she had a one-night stand and gave Lee chlamydia. Whitney initially ends their relationship and considers leaving Walford, but later decides to give him another chance. Whitney is pleased when Ryan is released from prison and he tells her he is moving to Wakefield. He offers Whitney and Lee to move in with him and she accepts, but later declines when Linda strongly disapproves of them moving so far away. Whitney and Ryan share an emotional farewell. Whitney suffers spotting and is taken to hospital with Lee, Linda and Mick, where the bleeding gets heavier. A scan shows Whitney has miscarried her baby, devastating her and Lee. Lauren encourages Whitney to find out whether she lost their baby due to him giving her chlamydia and she confides in Johnny (now played by Ted Reilly) that chlamydia might have caused it but tells Lee that the doctors said it could not have. Whitney decides to go Milton Keynes to stay with Bianca but returns the next day with Bianca's wedding dress and intends to get married. She reassures everyone she is fine and is thrown another hen party. Whitney marries Lee with Stacey acting as maid of honour in place of an ill Lauren and Tiffany and Lily as bridesmaids. Whitney is disappointed to learn that Lee was behind the robbery at The Vic but is unaware how close to suicide he was. She argues with Lee over money and Danny Mitchell (Liam Bergin) who tries to kiss her. Whitney then turns to Mick for support, and sleeps at The Queen Vic. The next day she is reconciled with an apologetic Lee but finds his wage slip showing how little he earns. Following another argument with Lee, Whitney confides in Mick, telling him she is going to buy Ryan an engagement present. Later, a bus crashes into the market and Whitney is trapped underneath it. Whitney is rescued and in hospital, she talks to Mick about her marriage. He comforts her and she kisses him, which is seen by Denise Fox (Diane Parish). Whitney decides to organise a night out and pawns her wedding ring for cash. Lee discovers what she has done and they start arguing. When Whitney says he doesn't deserve her, Lee slaps her in the face. Shortly after the incident Whitney lies on the bed in silence, with Lee begging for forgiveness. Whitney confides in Lauren who strongly advises her to leave Lee.

Whitney decides to give Lee another chance on the condition that he will never assault her again, therefore he should seek anger management therapy. Lee gratefully accepts for the sake of their marriage. However, on Valentine's Day, Lee leaves Whitney, leaving a handwritten note on their bed saying he no longer loves her. He returns the following day, apologising to Whitney for his actions and tells her of his plans to move to Dover. An upset Whitney, realising that Lee plans to leave on his own to figure himself out, tells him to leave and she watches him from the window as he drives off. Whitney becomes closer to Mick in Linda's absence and is warned by Shirley to stay away from him. When Mick leaves to look after Nancy when she is hit by a car Whitney is left in charge of running the pub. She later steals Vincent Hubbard's (Richard Blackwood) credit card to pay for a dog pen for Lady Di (Hot Lips), as the Carters cannot afford it due to their debts. Whitney later grows close to new bar manager Woody Woodward (Lee Ryan). Lee attempts to call Whitney but Woody tells Lee that she does not want to speak to him, so Lee sends his friend Moose (Sam Gittins) to see her, who says that Lee wants a divorce. Whitney receives a letter from Lee's solicitor, citing her unreasonable behaviour as grounds for the divorce, but Woody tells her it is not a big deal. Whitney declares that she is going to move on with her life and goes out shopping, but Woody sees she has not taken her purse and goes to give it to her. Whitney is caught shoplifting by a security guard, who offers her sex in exchange for not calling the police. Woody arrives and punches the guard, and takes Whitney home. Whitney and Woody kiss and have sex, and then a returning Mick finds them in bed together. Mick finds more items that Whitney has shoplifted, and she says she should never have married Lee as she is damaged and only good for sex but he tells her she is wrong and promises not to leave again. Mick lashes out at Whitney after learning that Linda and Shirley sold the freehold of The Queen Vic without his knowledge to pay for an operation for Lady Di. A few days later, Whitney is depressed and vulnerable and, when Mick kisses her, she responds. When Shirley finds out about the kiss, she orders Whitney to get out, telling her that Mick would never choose her over Linda. Devastated, Whitney leaves Walford.

Whitney returns two months later. She moves back into The Queen Vic and takes back her barmaid job. Whitney reveals that she is engaged to Woody and asks Mick to give her away at their wedding. Mick struggles with Woody's presence, but agrees to get on with him for Whitney's sake and Whitney admits to Mick that although she cannot be with him, she loves him. Linda throws her out after she realises that she is the person Mick kissed and Whitney moves in with Stacey, her husband and Bianca's cousin, Martin Fowler (James Bye), and their children. Mick offers her £200 in lieu of lost wages but she tells him to keep his dirty money, annoyed with him revealing everything. When Woody is offered a job in Spain as a bar manager, he asks Whitney to come with him and she accepts. However, at the last minute, Whitney discovers a note outside the tube station from Woody saying that she is better to remain in Walford. Heartbroken, Whitney visits Bianca but then returns to Walford and then moves in with Stacey. Whitney plans to move to Wakefield to restart her t-shirt business after being fired from The Queen Vic and the lack of opportunity in Walford. However, Tiffany returns so Whitney cancels her plans. Tiffany arranges a date between Whitney and Callum "Halfway" Highway (Tony Clay), but Whitney leaves the date after being put off by his behaviour. On Valentine's Day, Whitney rejects Halfway's surprise but she is touched when Halfway talks about how his grandfather brought him up to treat women with respect. Whitney apologizes for her attitude, but Halfway has to leave for the army. They then continue to stay in touch via video chat. Halfway returns from the Army and they resume their relationship, eventually trying for a baby. Whitney and Halfway become engaged and during their respective stag and hen parties, Halfway confesses to having kissed Ben Mitchell (Max Bowden). Whitney threatens Ben, but agrees to continue with the wedding after a discussion with Halfway. Bianca returns on the wedding day and convinces Whitney not to marry Halfway. Whitney insists that she loves Halfway, but jilts him at the altar and encourages him not to live a lie with his sexuality. During a siege at The Queen Vic, Ben is shot and Whitney begins to realize that Halfway has feelings for Ben. This causes Whitney to start drinking and Bianca suggests that Whitney go on her honeymoon alone to clear her mind off Halfway.

Whitney returns from her solo honeymoon and soon announces that she has met another man. The man is revealed to be Leo (Tom Wells), unbeknownst to Whitney, the son of Tony. Whitney and Leo continue their fling, but Whitney struggles to move on from Halfway and attempts to kiss him, but is rejected. Whitney decides to put her fling with Leo on pause. She and Leo later rekindle their relationship despite Jack warning her he thinks Leo is suspicious and Tiffany telling her she has met him at Whitney and Halfway's wedding. In December 2019, Leo takes Whitney to a hotel for her birthday and Tiffany finally calls and asks Bianca who Leo really is. Once she finds out he is Tony's son she calls Whitney to tell her and she and Halfway rush to the hotel to find her. Whitney tries to leave the hotel room after talking to Tiffany but Leo does not let her, yelling at her as she hides in the bathroom that he wants her to admit the truth and say that she and Bianca had made up the story that Tony had abused Whitney. She agrees to tell him the truth and goes on to explain what really happened - that Tony did abuse her as a child and that she has finally accepted that it was not her fault that she was abused. Leo angrily attacks Whitney but she gains the upper hand and he leaves the hotel room upset at finding out the truth about his father. Halfway and Tiffany arrive at the hotel but Whitney says she is fine and took care of it. Leo later starts stalking Whitney, telling her he believes her about Tony and that he loves her because of their both having a connection to Tony. One day Whitney agrees to speak with him at E20 and he tells her he wants to continue their relationship. Whitney tells him that will never happen. He then opens a stall at the market to be close to Whitney and even goes on a date with Dotty imagining that she is Whitney. Whitney's hair starts falling out because of the stress.

Kat offers to trade jobs with Whitney for a week so she can have a break from seeing Leo at the market. Leo jeopardizes the Slaters' cleaning company as payback resulting in a fight with Leo in the market. Jack advises Whitney to start writing down everything Leo does as evidence which she does in a notebook. Leo is then arrested at The Queen Vic thanks to Jack and Whitney, Martin, Kush and Kat go to celebrate. While they are having fun Whitney steps out onto the balcony and sees Leo. She rushes to call the police but Leo arrives on the balcony and pushes her, causing her to drop her phone. Kush arrives and seeing Leo has got hold of Whitney, saves her and accidentally pushes Leo which causes him to fall off the balcony. Leo is fine and Kush gets arrested so Whitney feels guilty and decides to visit Leo at the hospital and pretend to want to get back together with him so that he will drop the charges against Kush, especially because her phone is broken which had all the evidence of the constant calls and texts from Leo. Leo agrees to not press charges but when she steps out of the hospital room he finds her evidence notebook in her bag which he takes. A few days later Whitney agrees to meet with Leo and he takes her to Tony's grave where he pushes her into the ground forcing her to apologize to Tony. After she does as he says, Leo says it is not good enough and takes her to The Queen Vic where he forces her to announce to everyone that she has been lying about Tony abusing her and that she has made it up as a teen for attention. Everyone stands up for Whitney, knowing she is just being forced to tell them that, and Leo leaves. Whitney thinks he is gone but unbeknownst to her he hides in the attic of Dot's house where Whitney is now living and is spying on her through a hole in the ceiling of her room. When she does not go to Kush's hearing Kat is upset with her and Kush visits Whitney where she apologizes to him for not being there for him, explaining she is still recovering from the graveyard ordeal. She also tells Kush about a letter she still has written to her from Tony which Leo overhears. Whitney goes to Kat's house to apologize for not being there to support Kush and they make up, but when they go back to Dot's house they discover the place has been ransacked as Leo was searching for Tony's letter. The next day Kat and Ruby suggest Whitney goes to the Carter's Boat Party to get her mind off things and she agrees. When she is getting ready Leo appears in her room with a knife, threatening her and telling her that the letter from Tony was written soon before he committed suicide and that he states that he always loved Whitney, which Leo thinks proves that Whitney was lying since Tony did not admit to abusing her or apologize, only writing that he always loved her. Whitney tries to escape by first throwing a jewelry box at him but she realizes all the doors in the house are locked and she can't get out. She pushes him in the kitchen and he is seemingly knocked out before jumping up again and assaulting Whitney. She grabs the knife in defence and he accidentally falls on it. In a panic after realising he is dead, Whitney calls Mick for help and he tells her they are going to the boat party for an alibi. Mick washes the knife and Whitney puts it in her purse. At the boat party, Whitney considers throwing the knife overboard but Jack arrives to talk to her. Mick later tells her he will help her and take the blame for Leo's murder. Meanwhile, Sonia arrives home and sees Leo's body in the kitchen. When police arrive to tell Sonia about some bad drugs that Bex might be taking she doesn't tell them about the body and they leave. At the boat party, Linda accuses Mick and Whitney of having an affair since she saw them leaving Dot's house together. After the boat crashes and everyone is back on the docks in the aftermath of the accident, Whitney decides to confess to murdering Leo and tells the police she killed someone, showing them the knife in her bag as Jack watches on. She is later brought to the police station.

Gray offers to represent Whitney and she is questioned by police who are doubtful as to why she would have gone to the boat party if she had killed Leo in self-defence. Whitney struggles in prison in the days leading up to her bail hearing, during which she is denied bail meaning she will stay in prison until her trial, despite Kush pleading guilty on Gray's advice that it will help Whitney's case. In her cell she has a meltdown, throwing her tray of food and punching the wall until her hands bleed as she cries over her new reality of being in prison. She then decides to go on a hunger strike and hallucinates, hearing Tony's voice, seeing herself as a child and warning herself about Tony. She then collapses and is taken to hospital, where Gray later informs her that he found evidence that Leo had been hiding in her house and spying on her for weeks. This new piece of evidence then helps Whitney to get bail and she is released until her trial. She struggles with being back in her room and knowing how Leo was spying on her.

Leo's mother, Michaela, confronts Whitney wanting to find out what happened to Leo. She turns on Whitney, blaming her and saying the whole situation was her fault and that she also did the same to Tony. Michaela then posts online criticizing Whitney about her relationship with Tony and Leo, which leads to her being harassed online. Whitney is convinced that a jury won't believe her and that she'll go to prison, and after talking with Max about his own experience in prison, she decides to go on the run. She writes goodbye letters for her family and friends, and after Max learns from Gray that her chances of being let off are slim, he helps her by giving her money and a burner phone. While everyone is having drinks at the Vic, Gray arrives and announced that Michaela has been arrested. This news along with everyone's support makes Whitney change her mind about running away, and she decides to stay to face her trial, telling Max about her change of heart and returning the money. She later throws out her letters to her family in the trash. That night, Whitney is kidnapped again knife point by Michaela and taken to a locked room. Her friends and family worry as they find the letters in the bin and think she has indeed run away, and with an important bail meeting coming up it is crucial that she be there. Michaela is still convinced that Whitney is to blame for Leo's death and wants her to confess. Michaela also reveals that she kicked Tony out, rather than him leaving her for Bianca. Whitney realizes that she must have known about Tony and that was why she broke things off. The burner phone Max gave her rings, and Whitney is quickly able to cry for help as Max listens on the other line.

Creation
In October 2007, it was announced that the character Bianca Jackson was returning to EastEnders after an absence of six years. Whitney was created as part of her new family; the daughter of Bianca's deceased partner Nathan Dean. She was described as "a teenage drama queen, unable to engage brain before mouth and constantly finding herself in and out of trouble". Bianca sees Whitney as one of her own, and also as "a friend and confidante". EastEnders''' executive producer Diederick Santer said that his vision for the character was someone "quite spiky, quite gobby, a bit of an equal to Bianca, and in a way a version of Bianca at that age". Shona McGarty was cast in the role.

Considering the character's role in the wider context of the show as a whole, it was decided that Whitney would be involved in a sexual relationship with Bianca's partner Tony King. BBC News described the plot as an ongoing "predatory paedophile storyline", noting that this was the first time this subject matter had been tackled by a UK soap opera. The storyline was conceived when EastEnders series consultant Simon Ashdown viewed a documentary about homelessness, featuring a mother and child at a bus stop with nowhere to go. Ashdown questioned what might happen if a paedophile were to befriend the mother in order to grow closer to the child, and related the scenario to Bianca's return to the soap. BBC Head of Drama John Yorke explained that the idea when presented "drew a sharp intake of breath. Most EastEnders stories that have been good and successful have been the ones that caused the sharp intake of breath, so they're always the kind of stories you look for."

The idea that McGarty play a child groomed for sex was put to the actress on 9 January 2008. Santer has stated that, had McGarty or her parents objected to the storyline, they would not have gone ahead with it. In the event, McGarty's parents merely requested that their daughter not be asked to publicise the role, and the actress began filming her first scenes on 14 January 2008.

McGarty filmed her 1000th episode as Whitney in June 2018, over ten years after she joined the soap. In 2020, Phoebe Farnham portrayed a younger version of the character in a hallucination experienced by Whitney.

Development
Sexual abuse
In order to develop Whitney's sexual abuse storyline, by March 2008 EastEnders researchers Libby Duplock and Cleo Bicat were in contact with the NSPCC's Tom Narducci, Jude Toasland, who deals with abused children, and Yvonne Traynor, CEO of the Rape and Sexual Abuse Support Centre. Duplock has stated that: "One thing that was quite difficult for me to get right was the idea that she didn't want sex. It's Whitney's way of keeping Tony happy. If she lets him do it, then he's nicer to her and he makes her feel special." Research highlighted the fact that 12% of abused children go on to become abusers in turn, however Duplock explained: "We felt that to imply on TV that someone who has been abused is going to go on to abuse other people is not a message you want to give out. Those people have been through enough." Narducci for the NSPCC stated that importance was placed on making children viewing the show "feel comfortable about asking for help if they felt they needed it [and] for the wider community - to recognise the signs and let them know that they can do something about it. [...] We're not trying to cause a national panic. This is a responsible effort to try to get over an important story."

It had initially been decided that, alongside Tony's sexual abuse, Whitney would be seen to self-harm. This aspect of the storyline was discarded, after the NSPCC suggested that it may distract from the main issue of her abuse. Final approval for the storyline was sought from BBC Head of Fiction Jane Tranter on 2 June 2008. Tranter explained:

"I thought it was a fantastically good idea. The big moments in EastEnders, those iconic pieces of television history, tend to be the things that are incredibly near the knuckle, and are actually quite difficult subjects to raise in the context of a family sitting room. [...] Soaps are meant to hold up a mirror to our lives, and sometimes that mirror will show ugly bits, difficult bits, taboo bits. But if a soap doesn't hold up that mirror, then actually, what is it? It will have no depth."

Chris Coghill was cast as Whitney's abuser Tony on 20 June 2008. Upon accepting the role, he commented: "Shona doesn't act, or look, like a little child. Which helps." He has added of their off-screen relationship: "Shona's fantastic to work with. She's very natural, very instinctive and a natural actress. There isn't any uncomfortable feeling at all." Having undergone a thorough characterisation session, Coghill began shooting on 30 June 2008, and first appeared on-screen on 12 September 2008. Coghill has explained that Tony began grooming Whitney as soon as he met Bianca, ingratiating himself so as to become the family's "hero figure" and "saviour". Discussing his character's relationship with Whitney, Coghill explained that: "The lie that Tony has spun to Whitney is that as soon as she's 16 they'll run away together and start a new life. But Tony's the type of paedophile who preys on younger children. Whitney is beginning to pass her sell-by date with him. [...] He feels like he's losing his little girl but needs to keep Whitney under his control and not speak out." Coghill stated that: "This is the most challenging role I have had to play. But I hope by EastEnders tackling the sensitive issue of child abuse it can raise awareness." When asked how she felt about the abuse storyline, Palmer commented: "It would be brilliant if it helped somebody. If one person out there who's been abused saw [the legal system] go out of their way to make it easier on the victim – Whitney's evidence is given by video link – it will be worth it."

Sexual exploitation
In January 2011, it was announced that Whitney would be part of an upcoming storyline on sexual exploitation. Whitney is left alone and vulnerable, and falls for a man, Rob Grayson, played by Jody Latham, who exploits her for financial gain. EastEnders worked alongside charity Comic Relief on the storyline, which started planning in 2010. The storyline culminated during Red Nose Day 2011 on 19 March 2011, in a special ten-minute episode. Gilly Green, Head of UK Grants at Comic Relief, said: "It is vital that we continue to alert young people to the dangers if we are to stop them being exploited and the opportunity to work with EastEnders will make a huge audience aware of this issue. We have been working with the EastEnders script writers and some of the young women from projects we support to ensure the story reflects the reality of young people caught up in sexual exploitation." Kevin Cahill, Chief Executive of Comic Relief, added "We have worked over many years with EastEnders in all kinds of ways. It's been a real pleasure this year to work together on a piece of serious drama, in the best traditions of public service, which will highlight an important issue and also, because it occurs on the night of Comic Relief, actually help raise crucial funds to help young women caught up in it." The storyline begins when Bianca is sent to prison and Whitney rejects her family, moving in with Janine and attempting to make money by stealing from The Queen Victoria, causing her to get sacked, working for Max, whom she tries to kiss as she has a crush on him, and pickpocketing. When she is caught, Rob rescues her from the situation and offers her what McGarty called a "dream life", which Whitney thinks is her chance to move up in the world as she feels lonely and has no friends.

McGarty told Inside Soap that she hoped the storyline would have a positive impact, saying that she had done some research herself before filming, meeting teenage girls who had been exploited and hearing their experiences. She said she felt honoured and privileged to be given the storyline.

Temporary departure
McGarty was suspended from the show in July 2012 across four weeks for "persistent lateness to arrive on set". A show insider described her lateness as a big problem because it "regularly held up the filming of vital scenes." McGarty apologised for her lateness. In 2016, she discussed her suspension with The Sun magazine Fabulous and said her actions were "lazy and irresponsible" and the suspension made her realise the consequences of her actions. McGarty promised fans that she was now punctual for work.

Other appearances
Whitney makes a cameo appearance in episode eight of the second series of the Internet spin-off series EastEnders: E20, in which she buys some trainers from Asher Levi (Heshima Thompson) but later returns them as they are of different sizes. Jane Beale (Laurie Brett) joins the argument and snatches Asher's wallet when he says he does not give refunds, but he snatches it back. Jane tells two police officers he is a thief and they chase after him.

Reception
The BBC and television regulatory body Ofcom received upward of 90 complaints after Whitney's first scenes with Tony aired. However, they ruled that the scenes were not in breach of broadcasting rules. The Guardian Aida Edemariam said of the beginning of the storyline: "what is most disturbing, watching [Tony and Whitney's] first scenes together, is not the sexuality of the situation per se, though that is uncomfortable - it's the subtle blackmail with which he keeps her in line. As it's combined with the emotional manipulation native to soaps, the viewer starts to feel a bit bullied, too." Numbers of viewer complaints rose within days to over 200. New Statesman journalist Jeremy Sare commented on the public outrage and defended EastEnders decision to air the storyline, writing:

"There may be some justification for the hundreds complaining about these distressing issues being presented in prime time: equally it is courageous for the Beeb to include a scenario which challenges the public’s perception of what is a ‘typical paedophile’. The repellent Tony’s grooming and seduction of his stepdaughter, Whitney, is a much more familiar pattern of abuse than the more commonly held image of predators lurking in parks. [...] The producers of Eastenders, labouring under a welter of tabloid protest and viewers’ complaints, are attempting to make people get past the initial revulsion of the act of abuse and accept the grim fact that ‘paedophiles’ are very often members of the same family."

Sare quoted a BBC spokeswoman as saying: "we appreciate that for some viewers this storyline will have particular resonance and significance. In running it, it's certainly not our intention to cause distress or upset, either to those who've suffered from sexual abuse or their families. Our aim is instead to raise awareness of this very sensitive issue", concluding his article with the summation: "The producers' dilemma is instructive to children’s charities and Ministers alike on how to confront the issue in a digestible manner which can stimulate an objective debate."

The Daily Mirror Beth Neil branded the plot strand "one of the darkest and most disturbing storylines EastEnders has ever attempted", with critic Jim Shelley deeming it a "new low" for EastEnders. Shelley wrote of Whitney's abuse: "You've really got to hand it to EastEnders. Just when you thought the show couldn't get any more miserable, the writers come up trumps and produce a new way of making us depressed - a paedophile storyline. Thanks for that! I realise now this is what the family meal has been missing three nights a week: gathering the telly to watch a grubby, greasyhaired thug drooling over a 15-year-old girl who (as luck would have it) spends her entire life in her school uniform even when she's not at school. And they say family entertainment's dead." Shelley refuted the BBC's claims that the storyline had educational value as "totally bogus", observing that "At 7.30 or 8pm, the "action" has to be so coded as to be pointless". Deborah Orr, writing for The Independent, similarly disagreed with the BBC's statement that the storyline was part of EastEnders' "rich heritage of tackling difficult social issues", writing that:

"Actually, it's part of its rich heritage of leaping in to some horrific subject without any background or build-up at all. The implication is that Tony, the villain, had been grooming the child for some time before he went to prison, when she was only 12. But such a thing really would be too real, and too controversial, so the viewer only gets to see the result of those hinted-at dark machinations.

"It might be a public service to dramatise the manner in which a paedophile might worm his way into a vulnerable family. But such a storyline would have to be explored carefully and over a long period. All that this little adventure in broadcasting can possibly deliver is the message that a paedophile in the heart of the home is not a good thing. Who needs to be educated about this?"The Guardian Julie Raeside questioned: "Is this latest sexual abuse storyline a good thing to position in a pre-watershed soap opera, or should the EastEnders storyliners stick to a less controversial brand of misery?" However, in contrast to public and media dissent, the NSPCC's director of communications, John Grounds, praised the storyline for "helping to raise awareness of the hidden nature of sexual abuse", deeming it to be "vital in persuading people to take action to stop it and encouraging children to speak out."

Episodes from Whitney's storyline were submitted to the Royal Television Society Programme Awards 2008 for a panel to judge in the category Soap and Continuing Drama. EastEnders was presented with the award in March 2009, beating Coronation Street and The Bill''. Members of the judging panel described the submitted episodes as "the culmination of a particularly challenging and controversial storyline which the production team, writers and cast pulled off triumphantly." In August 2017, McGarty was longlisted for Best Actress and Sexiest Female at the Inside Soap Awards. She did not progress to the viewer-voted shortlist.

See also
 List of EastEnders characters (2008)
 List of EastEnders: E20 characters

References

External links
 

Television characters introduced in 2008
Fictional market stallholders
Fictional prostitutes
Fictional bartenders
Fictional murderers
Female characters in television
Fictional prisoners and detainees
Fictional victims of sexual assault
Beale family (EastEnders)
Carter family (EastEnders)
Fictional singers
Teenage characters in television
Fictional victims of child sexual abuse
Crossover characters in television
Branning family